Unity Township is one of fourteen townships in Rowan County, North Carolina, United States. The township had a population of 2,215 according to the 2010 census.

Geographically, Unity Township occupies  in northwestern Rowan County.  There are no incorporated municipalities in Unity Township.  The township's northern boundary is with Davie County.

Residents are served by the Rowan–Salisbury School System.

History
Villages, churches, and schools in Unity Township have included the following:
 Audubon
 Barber School
 Cooleemee Cotton Mills
 Harrison School
 Hart School
 Lebanon Lutheran Church, formed in 1893
 Unity Presbyterian Church, formed in 1788
 Woodleaf or Wood Leaf until 1877, post office established on 4 September 1855  with Daniel Wood as the first postmaster
 Woodleaf Baptist Church, formed in 1978
 Woodleaf Speedway
 Woodlead United Methodist Church

Adjacent townships
Calahaln Township, Davie County – northwest
Cleveland – southwest
Franklin – east
Jerusalem Township, Davie County – northeast
Litaker – southeast
Mocksville Township, Davie County – north
Scotch Irish – west
Steele – south

References

Townships in Rowan County, North Carolina
Townships in North Carolina